is a yakuza film directed by Takashi Miike. It is a remake of Kinji Fukasaku's 1975 film of the same name, which is based on the life of a real-life Yakuza member.

Plot
A barkeeper saves a Yakuza boss's life and thus makes his way up in the organization. However, his fear of nothing soon causes problems.

Cast
Narimi Arimori as Chieko Kikuta
Yoshiyuki Daichi as Yoshiyuki Ooshita
Hirotaro Honda as Correctional officer
Harumi Inoue as Yōko Imamura
Renji Ishibashi as Denji Yukawa
Goro Kishitani as Rikuo Ishimatsu
Takashi Miike as Restaurant gunman
Ryōsuke Miki as Kōzō Imamura
Yasukaze Motomiya as Kanemoto
Mikio Ōsawa as Masato Yoshikawa
Daisuke Ryu as Tadaaki Kuze
Harumi Sone as Ryuuzō Fukui
Shun Sugata as Toshi Nishizaki
Tetsurō Tamba as Tetsuji Tokura
Yoshiyuki Yamaguchi as Shigeru Hashida
Shingo Yamashiro as Shinobu Sawada
Shinji Yamashita as Masaru Narimura
Rikiya Yasuoka as Aoyama

Other credits
Production
Michinao Kai: assistant producer
Mitsuru Kurosawa: executive producer: Toei Video
Shigeji Maeda: producer
Fujio Matsushima: planner
Fujio Matsushima: supervising producer
Hitoki Ookoshi: line producer
Tsuneo Seto: supervising planner
Shigenori Takechi: planner
Ken Takeuchi: supervising planner
Tsutomu Tsuchikawa: executive producer: Daiei
Kazuyuki Yokoyama: producer
Production design: Tatsuo Ozeki
Production manager: Hirofumi Yamabe
Assistant Director: Bunmei Katō
Sound Department
Yukiya Sato: sound
Kenji Shibazaki: sound effects

External links 
 

2002 films
2000s crime thriller films
Yakuza films
2000s Japanese-language films
Films directed by Takashi Miike
2000s Japanese films